William South may refer to:
 William South (photographer), American photographer and inventor
 William South (jockey), British jockey
 William Garnet South, police officer in Alice Springs , Australia
 William Howard South, political figure in Nova Scotia
 Will South, member of the British band Thirteen Senses